Why We Laugh: Black Comedians on Black Comedy is a 2009 documentary film based on the book Black Comedians on Black Comedy: How African-Americans Taught Us to Laugh, by Darryl J. Littleton.

Plot
The film analyzes the history of comedy and how the television and film industries have stereotyped African Americans throughout a multitude of generations. Quincy Newell, Executive Vice-President of Codeblack Entertainment, was the producer and co-writer with John Long on the project. The documentary was a selection of the 2009 Sundance Film Festival, and eventually acquired by Showtime. Newell himself has stated "the intent of the film is to spark meaningful discourse."

Cast 
The film features commentary from black comedians including:
 Chris Rock
 Eddie Murphy
 Dave Chappelle
 Steve Harvey
 Katt Williams
 Marlon Wayans
 Sherri Shepherd
 Niecy Nash
 Marla Gibbs
 Dick Gregory

References 

2009 films
2009 documentary films
Documentary films about African Americans
Documentary films about comedy and comedians